The borough president is an elected office in each of the five Boroughs of New York City. For most of the city's history, the office exercised significant executive powers within each borough, and the five borough presidents also sat on the New York City Board of Estimate. Since 1990, the borough presidents have been stripped of a majority of their powers in the government of New York City.

Borough presidents advise the mayor of New York City, comment on land-use items in their borough, advocate borough needs in the annual municipal budget process, appoint some officials and community board members, and serve ex officio as members of various boards and committees. They generally act as advocates for their boroughs to mayoral agencies, the city council, the New York State government, public corporations, and private businesses. Their authorizing law is codified in title 4, sections 81 to 85 of the New York City Charter, while their regulations are compiled in title 45 of the New York City Rules.

History

On January 1, 1898, the boroughs of Manhattan, the Bronx, Brooklyn, Queens, and Richmond were created and consolidated into a unified city of New York. As part of the consolidation, all town and county governments within the city were dissolved, and their powers were given to the city and the boroughs. Manhattan and the Bronx comprised New York County, Brooklyn was the same as Kings County, the borough of Queens was the western third of Queens County, and the borough of Richmond was the same as Richmond County. The boroughs assumed most county functions, but did not replace them. The five offices of borough president were created to administer many of the previous responsibilities of the mayors of Brooklyn and Long Island City, the executive branch functions of the towns in Queens and Richmond, and various county functions.

The eastern two-thirds of Queens County was not part of the borough of Queens. On April 19, 1912, the New York State Legislature passed a law forming Bronx County from part of New York County on January 1, 1914, with the latter then becoming coterminous with the Borough of Manhattan. In 1975, the name of the borough of Richmond was officially changed to Staten Island.

The initial city charter established the five borough president offices with terms of four years, coinciding with the term of the mayor. The salaries of the presidents of Manhattan, the Bronx, and Brooklyn were $5,000, and those of Queens and Richmond were $3,000. The borough presidents were subject to removal for cause by the mayor, with approval by the governor, and a replacement elected by the borough's aldermen and councilmen. Powers included membership and voting on their borough's local boards (although without veto powers), an office in the borough hall, and appointive powers for a secretary, assistants, and clerks, which quickly became a source of political patronage. Along with the mayor, the comptroller and the president of the City Council, each of whom had two votes, the borough presidents each had one vote on the New York City Board of Estimate, which decided matters ranging from budgets to land use.

In a later writer's words, the offices of the borough presidents were created to preserve "local pride and affection for the old municipalities" after consolidation.

Upon the formation of the unicameral Board of Aldermen in 1902, borough presidents were each entitled to a seat on the Board.

Borough presidents gradually gained more authority, assisting in the formulation of more aspects of the city budget and controlling land use, contracts, and franchise powers. Officials of political parties sometimes rewarded faithful public servants with nomination to the borough president position in primary elections, or election of an interim borough president via the aldermen or councilmen whose votes they controlled, in return for political patronage. Although some borough presidents served for decades, the position was sometimes used as a stepping-stone to other elective offices such as judgeships or, in the case of Robert F. Wagner, Jr., mayor.

On March 22, 1989, the Supreme Court of the United States, in Board of Estimate of City of New York v. Morris (489 U.S. 688) unanimously declared the New York City Board of Estimate, which had no parallel anywhere else in the United States, unconstitutional on the grounds that Brooklyn, the city's most populous borough, with a population of 2.2 million at the time, had the same representation on the board as Staten Island, the city's least populous borough, with 350,000 residents, and therefore was a violation of the Fourteenth Amendment's Equal Protection Clause pursuant to the high court's 1964 "one man, one vote" decision.

The city charter was quickly revised and passed in a referendum that fall, and the Board of Estimate was abolished. The offices of the borough presidents were retained, but with greatly reduced power. The borough budgets became the responsibility of the mayor and City Council. Borough presidents currently have a relatively small discretionary budget for projects within their boroughs. The last significant power of the borough presidents, to appoint members of the New York City Board of Education, was abolished when the Board of Education became the Department of Education on June 30, 2002.

Roles and responsibilities

The two major remaining appointments of the borough presidents are one member each on the New York City Planning Commission and two members each of the New York City Panel for Educational Policy. Borough presidents generally adopt specific projects to promote while in office, but since 1990 have been mainly ceremonial leaders. Officially, they advise the mayor on issues relating to their boroughs, comment on land-use items in their boroughs, advocate for their boroughs' needs in the annual municipal budget process, appoint community boards, chair the boroughs' boards, and serve as ex officio members of various boards and committees. They also act as advocates for their boroughs at mayoral agencies, the City Council, the New York State government, public corporations, and private businesses.

Borough presidents are elected by popular vote to four-year terms and can serve up to two consecutive terms (eight years).

Borough presidents influence the Uniform Land Use Review Procedure (ULURP) by appointing community boards and voting on the applications. The staff of boroughwide economic development corporations are often closely aligned with the borough president, and work closely with the New York City Economic Development Corporation, the primary coordinating agency of city-sponsored economic development.

Current borough presidents

The current borough presidents were either elected or re-elected in the most recent election in 2021:

Borough boards

Each of the five boroughs has a borough board. They are composed of the borough president, council members from the borough, and the chairperson of each community board in the borough. The borough boards can hold or conduct public or private hearings, adopt by-laws, prepare comprehensive and special purpose plans and make recommendations for land use and planning, mediate disputes and conflicts among two or more community districts, submit comprehensive statements of expense and capital budget priorities and needs, evaluate the progress of capital developments and the quality and quantity of services provided by agencies, and otherwise consider the needs of the borough.

Community boards

Each of the fifty-nine community districts has a community board composed of up to 50 volunteer members appointed by the borough president, half from nominations by City Council members representing the community district (i.e., whose council districts cover part of the community district). Community boards advise on land use and zoning, participate in the city budget process, and address service delivery in their district. Community boards act in an advisory capacity, and have no authority to make or enforce laws.

See also

 2021 New York City borough president elections
 Government of New York City
 Government and politics of the Bronx
 Government of Staten Island
 List of New York City borough halls and municipal buildings
 List of borough presidents of New York City

References

External links

 Borough Presidents in the Rules of the City of New York
 World Statesmen List of Borough Presidents
 Contact a Borough President
 Borough president websites
 The Bronx: 
 Brooklyn: 
 Manhattan: 
 Queens: 
 Staten Island: 

 
Government of New York City